Refuge Grand Tournalin is a refuge in the Alps in Aosta Valley, Italy.

Mountain huts in the Alps
Mountain huts in Italy